Alexander Noble Hall (3 December 1880 – 25 September 1943), sometimes known as Sandy Hall, was a  professional soccer player who played as a centre forward in the Scottish League for Dunfermline Athletic, Dundee, Motherwell and St Bernard's. Born in Scotland, he was a part of Canada's gold medal-winning 1904 Olympic team and finished the tournament as joint-top scorer, with three goals. The goals came in the form of a hat-trick in a 7–0 win over the United States, represented by Christian Brothers College.

Personal life 
Born in Aberdeen and growing up in Peterhead, Hall played amateur football and worked as a stonecutter locally before emigrating to Canada in 1901. He returned to Scotland in 1905 and became a professional footballer in 1906. In 1912, the Carnegie Hero Fund and the Royal Humane Society recognised Hall with awards for bravery, for his rescuing of a child from Peterhead harbour. While a player with Dunfermline Athletic prior to the First World War, he also served as the club's groundsman. During the war, Hall served in the Royal Garrison Artillery, the Royal Engineers, the Tank Corps and married his wife, with whom he had three children. The family emigrated to Toronto in 1923. Hall died there on 25 September 1943 and is buried in the city's Prospect Cemetery. In 1983, Hall's youngest son Tom was the world’s first recipient of a successful single lung transplant.

Career statistics

Honours 
Canada Olympic

 Summer Olympic Games: 1904

St Bernard's

 Scottish League Second Division: 1906–07

Dundee

 Scottish Cup: 1909–10
Motherwell

 Lanarkshire Cup: 1911–12

Dunfermline Athletic

 Fife Cup: 1913–14

Peterhead

 Aberdeenshire Charity Cup: 1920–21

Individual

 Summer Olympic Games top-scorer: 1904

References

External links
 
 
 
 

1880 births
1943 deaths
Canadian soccer players
Canadian expatriate soccer players
Association football forwards
Footballers at the 1904 Summer Olympics
Naturalized citizens of Canada
Olympic gold medalists for Canada
Olympic soccer players of Canada
Soccer people from Ontario
People from Peterhead
Olympic medalists in football
Medalists at the 1904 Summer Olympics
Footballers from Aberdeenshire
Scottish footballers
Hartlepool United F.C. players
Aberdeen F.C. players
Peterhead F.C. players
St Bernard's F.C. players
Newcastle United F.C. players
Dundee F.C. players
Portsmouth F.C. players
Southern Football League players
Motherwell F.C. players
Dunfermline Athletic F.C. players
British Army personnel of World War I
Royal Garrison Artillery soldiers
Royal Engineers soldiers
Royal Tank Regiment soldiers
Scottish expatriate sportspeople in Canada
Scottish expatriate footballers
Expatriate soccer players in Canada
Scottish emigrants to Canada
Scottish stonemasons
Buckie Thistle F.C. players
Burials in Ontario
Military personnel from Aberdeen